There are several Australian rules football leagues in regional Queensland.

The sport of Australian rules football has a rich history in Queensland which dates back to the 1860s, however the game outside of South East Queensland was slower to take off than in Brisbane.

In 1913, a team of servicemen briefly existed on Thursday Island, but was short-lived.  In 1944, a league of servicemen was formed around the Atherton Tableland.  Teams represented included Wongabel, Wondelca, Kairi, Mareeba and Ravenshoe.   The league was a precursor to the nearby Cairns, Queensland league.

In 1955, the Townsville Australian Football League began.  Two years later the Cairns Australian Football League was formed. AFL was also introduced to Mount Isa. In the early 1970s, organised leagues started appearing in Mackay, the Darling Downs and Central Queensland.

The Australian Football League has occasionally played pre-season matches in Cairns and there have been semi-regular premiership matches on the Gold Coast.

Current competitions

AFL Cairns

AFL Cairns is a semi-professional league that includes clubs from the Cairns region in Queensland, Australia.  It is widely regarded as the strongest regional Australian rules football league in Queensland and has a large base at Cazaly's Stadium which has staged pre-season Australian Football League matches.

The league has significant coverage in local media such as The Cairns Post. Each year the Grand Final attracts between 2,000–3,000 spectators.

AFL Capricornia

AFL Capricornia is an amateur competition played in the areas of Rockhampton, Gladstone and Yeppoon between the months of March and September in the cooler seasons of the Central Queensland climate.

The league is covered primarily by the Rockhampton Morning Bulletin in the local print media.

AFL Darling Downs

AFL Darling Downs is an amateur competition formed as the Darling Downs Australian Football League in 1971. It is based around the city of Toowoomba west of Brisbane. The senior representative team is known as the Demons and wear guernseys modelled on the Melbourne Demons guernseys. The Under 18 representative team who participate in the AFLQ Under 18 competition are known as the "Crows" and wear guernseys modelled on the Adelaide Crows guernseys.

AFL Mackay

AFL Mackay is an amateur competition formed as the Mackay Australian Football League in 1970. It is based around the city of Mackay with further clubs in Airlie Beach, Sarina, Alligator Creek, Pioneer Valley and Moranbah. The representative team is known as the Crows.

AFL Mount Isa

AFL Mount Isa is an amateur competition formed as the North West Australian Football League in 1967, changing its name to the Mount Isa AFL in 1969. Prior to this the game was played but was not organised. It is based around the city of Mount Isa.

Current Clubs

Premiers
North West Australian Football League (1967-1968) / Mount Isa AFL (1969-1999) / AFL Mount Isa (2000-present)

 1967: Hawks
 1968: Rovers
 1969: Saints
 1970: Saints
 1971: Tigers
 1972: Hawks
 1973: Tigers
 1974: Saints
 1975: Hawks
 1976: Rovers
 1977: Mary Kathleen
 1978: Mary Kathleen
 1979: Mary Kathleen
 1980: Rovers
 1981: Rovers
 1982: Rovers
 1983: Tigers
 1984: Rovers
 1985: Rovers
 1986: Rovers
 1987: Saints
 1988: Rovers
 1989: Tigers
 1990: Rovers
 1991: Rovers
 1992: Buffaloes
 1993: Rovers
 1994: Buffaloes
 1995: Buffaloes
 1996: Rovers
 1997: Rovers
 1998: Tigers
 1999: Tigers
 2000: Rovers
 2001: Rovers
 2002: Lake Nash, Mighty Bats
 2003: Lake Nash, Mighty Bats
 2004: Rovers
 2005: Rovers
 2006: Tigers
 2007: Rovers
 2008: Rovers
 2009: Rovers
 2010: Rovers
 2011: Tigers
 2012: Rovers
 2013: Rovers
 2014: Tigers
 2015: Tigers
 2016: Tigers
 2017: Buffaloes
 2018: Buffaloes

AFL Townsville

AFL Townsville is an amateur competition formed as the Townsville Australian Football League in 1955, the first AFL competition to be formed in Queensland outside of the South East. It is based around the city of Townsville. For a short period in the 1980s, the competition was played during the summer months. The representative team is known as the Eagles and they wear similar guernseys to the Zillmere Eagles old white and blue guernsey's.

AFL Wide Bay

The AFL Wide Bay competition was formerly known as the Bundaberg-Wide Bay Australian Football League which was formed in 1987 through the merger of the Bundaberg Australian Football League and Wide Bay Australian Football Leagues.  The competition currently features teams from the cities of Bundaberg, Maryborough and Hervey Bay. The representative team is known as the Tigers wearing guernseys similar to those of the Richmond Tigers.

Clubs

Premiers
Bundaberg Wide Bay AFL (1987-1999) / AFL Bundaberg Wide Bay (2000-2009) / AFL Wide Bay (2010-present)

 1987: West Bundaberg
 1988: Hervey Bay Bombers
 1989: Hervey Bay Bombers
 1990: Hervey Bay Bombers
 1991: Hervey Bay Bombers
 1992: Hervey Bay Bombers
 1993: Fraser Coast
 1994: Hervey Bay Bombers
 1995: West Bundaberg
 1996: Hervey Bay Bombers
 1997: ATW Bundaberg
 1998: ATW Bundaberg
 1999: ATW Bundaberg
 2000: Hervey Bay Bombers
 2001: ATW Bundaberg
 2002: Hervey Bay Bombers
 2003: League in recess
 2004: Hervey Bay Bombers
 2005: Hervey Bay Bombers
 2006: ATW Bundaberg
 2007: Hervey Bay Bombers
 2008: ATW Bundaberg
 2009: Hervey Bay Bombers
 2010: Brothers Bulldogs
 2011: ATW Bundaberg
 2012: Hervey Bay Bombers
 2013: Hervey Bay Bombers
 2014: ATW Bundaberg
 2015: ATW Bundaberg
 2016: ATW Bundaberg

Defunct competitions

Bundaberg AFL
The Bundaberg Australian Football League was an amateur competition formed in 1972 and continued until 1986, before merging with the Wide Bay Australian Football League, starting a new competition called the Bundaberg Wide Bay Australian Football League in 1987, now known as AFL Wide Bay.

The four foundation clubs were Burnett Heads, Southern Suburbs (South Bundaberg), Western Suburbs (West Bundaberg), and North Bundaberg.

Clubs

Premiers
Bundaberg AFL (1972-1986)

 1972: North Bundaberg
 1973: Western Suburbs
 1974: Western Suburbs
 1975: North Bundaberg
 1976: North Bundaberg
 1977: Hervey Bay
 1978: North Bundaberg
 1979: North Bundaberg
 1980: West Bundaberg
 1981: South Bundaberg
 1982: Hervey Bay
 1983: Hervey Bay
 1984: Urangan
 1985: West Bundaberg
 1986: West Bundaberg

Central Highlands AFL
The Central Highlands Australian Football League was an amateur competition formed in 1983 and ceased operations after the 1997 season. Most of the previous clubs still exist and operate Auskick programs, including Dysart and Emerald.  The Moranbah Bulldogs moved to the AFL Mackay after the league folded.

The league was a once flourishing competition with Clubs competing in Seniors, Reserves and juniors in Under 16's, 14's, and 12's.  Around 1994, the mines in the area shifted from a five-day week into a seven-day 12-hour roster, which in turn limited teams' playing rosters. The league then changed onfield playing numbers from 18 to 13 with unlimited bench players. Unfortunately this still did not help and most clubs were forced to cease operations due to lack of playing numbers and not of financial matters.

Prior to the formation of the competition, Dysart, Middlemount and Moranbah had played in the Mackay competition.

Clubs

Premiers
Central Highlands AFL (1983-1997)

 1983: Dysart
 1984: Dysart
 1985: Moranbah
 1986: Moranbah
 1987: Middlemount
 1988: Emerald
 1989: Emerald
 1990: Blackwater
 1991: Blackwater
 1992: Blackwater
 1993: Emerald
 1994: Emerald
 1995: Emerald
 1996: Emerald
 1997: Emerald

Gold Coast AFL
The Gold Coast Australian Football League was a competition that operated from at least 1961 to 1996 before being absorbed by the Queensland AFL as its Gold Coast Division.

Clubs

Premiers
Gold Coast AFL (1961-1996) / AFLQ - Gold Coast Division (1997-1999)

 1961: Southport
 1962: Southport
 1963: Surfers Paradise
 1964: Southport
 1965: Palm Beach-Currumbin
 1966: Southport
 1967: Surfers Paradise
 1968: Surfers Paradise
 1969: Surfers Paradise
 1970: Labrador
 1971: Palm Beach-Currumbin
 1972: Surfers Paradise
 1973: Palm Beach-Currumbin
 1974: Surfers Paradise
 1975: Southport
 1976: Southport
 1977: Southport
 1978: Coolangatta
 1979: Southport
 1980: Southport
 1981: Coolangatta
 1982: Coolangatta
 1983: Coolangatta
 1984: Surfers Paradise
 1985: Palm Beach-Currumbin
 1986: Labrador
 1987: Broadbeach
 1988: Coolangatta
 1989: Coolangatta
 1990: Surfers Paradise
 1991: Labrador
 1992: Surfers Paradise
 1993: Labrador
 1994: Labrador
 1995: Palm Beach-Currumbin
 1996: Broadbeach
 1997: Palm Beach-Currumbin
 1998: Surfers Paradise
 1999: Palm Beach-Currumbin

Maryborough AFL
The Maryborough Australian Football League was an amateur competition that lasted two full seasons in 1981 and 1982.  In 1983, there was only a limited number of fixtures, and due to lack of players, the competition folded after the season was over.

In 1983, Biggenden played in both the Bundaberg AFL and the Maryborough competition. Biggenden 2 lost to Cooloola Coast in the 1983 MAFL Grand Final, as their seniors did the previous year.

Clubs

Premiers
Maryborough AFL (1981-1983)

 1981 Biggenden
 1982 Cooloola Coast
 1983 Cooloola Coast

Sunshine Coast AFL
The Sunshine Coast Australian Football League was an amateur competition that was formed in 1970 and continued until 1992.  The three foundation clubs were Noosa, Maroochydore and Nambour.

In 1993, the clubs from the competition played in the Brisbane Australian Football League, and later split up into various AFL South Queensland Divisions.

Clubs

Premiers
Sunshine Coast AFL (1970-1992)

 1970: Maroochydore
 1971: Maroochydore
 1972: Maroochydore
 1973: Noosa
 1974: Maroochydore
 1975: Noosa
 1976: Noosa
 1977: Noosa
 1978: Maroochydore
 1979: Maroochydore
 1980: Noosa
 1981: Noosa
 1982: Maroochydore
 1983: Maroochydore
 1984: Maroochydore
 1985: Noosa
 1986: Maroochydore
 1987: Caloundra
 1988: Caloundra
 1989: Maroochydore
 1990: Nambour
 1991: Caloundra
 1992: Caloundra

Wide Bay AFL
The Wide Bay Australian Football League was a short-lived amateur competition that was formed in 1985 as a result of a breakaway from the Bundaberg AFL. It only lasted two years before merging with the league it broke away from.

Clubs

Premiers
Wide Bay AFL (1985-1986)

 1985: Hervey Bay Bombers
 1986: Hervey Bay Bombers

See also

Australian Rules football in Queensland

References

External links

Leagues
Official AFL Cairns Website
Official AFL Capricornia Site
Official AFL Darling Downs Site
Official AFL Mackay Website
Official AFL Mount Isa Website
Official AFL Townsville Website
Official AFL Wide Bay Website

Clubs
Brothers Roos Rockhampton Website
Twin City Lions Townsville
Thuringowa Bulldogs AFL Club site

Australian rules football competitions in Queensland